The Manifesto Against the Death of the Spirit and the Earth (Spanish: Manifiesto contra la Muerte del Espíritu y de la Tierra) was a text published in the Spanish magazine El Cultural on 19 June 2002. Coauthored by Álvaro Mutis and Javier Ruiz Portella and described as an initiative to promote the ideas of the Nouvelle Droite, the text decried the "disenchantment of the world" and the "annihilation of the spirit's life", with the authors worried about "the disappearance of that breath by which men affirm themselves as men and not only as organic entities".

The endorsements overcame a mere new-rightist profile, being actually ideologically transversal, with supporting intellectuals coming from both the left and right.

Originally in Spanish, from 2002 to 2004 the manifesto was translated to Arabic, Catalan, English, Italian and French.

References 
Informational notes

Citations

Bibliography
 
 
 

New Right (Europe)
Manifestos